Albert Falco (17 October 1927 – 21 April 2012) was a French scuba diving veteran and champion of underwater conservation. He was one of the longest-serving diving companions of Jacques Cousteau, Chief Diver, and later Captain of the RV Calypso. He lived in France and was active in preserving aquatic ecosystems. He played several leading roles on Cousteau's films, like The Silent World (1956), World Without Sun (1964) and Voyage to the Edge of the World (1976).  Falco was the author of a non-fiction book, Capitaine de La Calypso.

See also

References

External links
 

1927 births
2012 deaths
Aquanauts
French underwater divers
Sportspeople from Marseille
Pioneering scientific divers
Officers of the Ordre national du Mérite